John Nelson Hobbs (1923 – October 31, 1990) was a British-Australian career police officer and amateur ornithologist.

Career
Hobbs was born in London, England in 1923. After serving with the Metropolitan Police Force in London, he emigrated to Australia in 1952 and joined the NSW Police Force. He served as a police officer until 1980, mainly in country towns across New South Wales, where he made detailed studies of local birdlife. He retired to Dareton in the south-west of the state. He served on the Records Appraisal Committee of the Royal Australasian Ornithologists Union (RAOU) from 1975 to 1989, as well as contributing prolifically to the RAOU's Nest Record Scheme. Hobbs published his ornithological research in Australian Birds, Australian Bird Watcher, British Birds, Corella and Emu.

Death and legacy
Hobbs died from a heart attack on 31 October, 1990, while birding near Dareton, New South Wales. He was survived by his wife Shirley and four sons. Hobbs is commemorated by the J.N. Hobbs Memorial Medal, awarded annually from 1995 for major contributions to amateur ornithology.

See also
 List of ornithologists

References
Robin, Libby. (2001). The Flight of the Emu: a hundred years of Australian ornithology 1901-2001. Carlton, Vic. Melbourne University Press. 
Rowley, Ian. (1991). Obituary. J.N. Hobbs. Emu 91: 194.

1923 births
1990 deaths
Australian ornithologists
Australian police officers
Metropolitan Police officers
20th-century Australian zoologists